Monte Gambarogno (1,734 m) is a mountain of the Lugano Prealps, overlooking Lake Maggiore in the canton of Ticino. It lies on the range between Lake Maggiore and Lake Lugano, culminating at Monte Tamaro.

The summit is a popular vantage point and is easily accessible with a road culminating at the Alpe di Neggia (1,395 m).

References

External links

 Monte Gambarogno on Hikr

Mountains of the Alps
Mountains of Ticino
One-thousanders of Switzerland
Mountains of Switzerland